The 1906 New York Highlanders season, its fourth, finished with the team in 2nd place in the American League with a record of 90–61. The team was managed by Clark Griffith and played its home games at Hilltop Park.

Regular season

Season standings

Record vs. opponents

Roster

Player stats

Batting

Starters by position 
Note: Pos = Position; G = Games played; AB = At bats; H = Hits; Avg. = Batting average; HR = Home runs; RBI = Runs batted in

Other batters 
Note: G = Games played; AB = At bats; H = Hits; Avg. = Batting average; HR = Home runs; RBI = Runs batted in

Pitching

Starting pitchers 
Note: G = Games pitched; IP = Innings pitched; W = Wins; L = Losses; ERA = Earned run average; SO = Strikeouts

Other pitchers 
Note: G = Games pitched; IP = Innings pitched; W = Wins; L = Losses; ERA = Earned run average; SO = Strikeouts

Relief pitchers 
Note: G = Games pitched; W = Wins; L = Losses; SV = Saves; ERA = Earned run average; SO = Strikeouts

References 
1906 New York Highlanders at Baseball Reference
1906 New York Highlanders team page at www.baseball-almanac.com

New York Yankees seasons
New York Highlanders
New York Highlanders
1900s in Manhattan
Washington Heights, Manhattan